Anne Gulbrandsen (born 17 February 1994) is a Norwegian speed skater. She won a bronze medal in team sprint at the 2018 European Speed Skating Championships in Kolomna, Russia, along with Martine Ripsrud and Sofie Karoline Haugen. She competed at the World Sprint Speed Skating Championships in 2018.

References

External links 
 

1994 births
Living people
People from Eidsvoll
Norwegian female speed skaters
Sportspeople from Viken (county)